The following list gives a categorised overview of notable people from Kenya.

Pre-colonial leaders
 Koitalel Arap Samoei
 Mekatilili Wa Menza
 Nabongo Mumia
Waiyaki Wa Hinga

Anti-colonial activists
 Bildad Kaggia
 Dedan Kimathi
 Dennis Akumu
 Elijah Omolo Agar
 Esau Khamati Oriedo
 Fitz Remedios Santana de Souza
 Fred Kubai
 Harry Thuku
 Jaramogi Oginga Odinga
 John Keen (Kenya politician)
 Jomo Kenyatta
 Joseph Murumbi
 J.M. Kariuki
 Kung'u Karumba
 Makhan Singh (Kenyan trade unionist)
 Martin Shikuku
 Mary Muthoni Nyanjiru
 Masinde Muliro
 Musa Mwariama
 Ochola Ogaye Mak'Anyengo
 Paul Ngei
 Pio Gama Pinto
 Ramogi Achieng Oneko
 Stanley Mathenge
 Tom Mboya
 Wambui Otieno
 Waruhiu Itote

Politicians
 Moody Awori, Vice President, August, 2003–December 2007
 Nicholas Biwott, Member of Parliament, former Cabinet Ministère
 Cyrus Jirongo
 Josephat Karanja, Vice President 1988–1989
 J. M. Kariuki, assassinated 1975
 Uhuru Kenyatta, son of the first President, Jomo Kenyatta and 4th President of Kenya, 2013–present
 Mwai Kibaki, third President of Kenya December 2002 – March 2013
 Esau Khamati Oriedo, first served in the District House Assembly the Local Native Council (LNC) of North Nyanza; original member of KAU progenitor to KANU.
 Michael Wamalwa Kijana, Vice President 3 January 2003 – August 2003
 Catherine Omanyo, Member of Parliament and school founder
 Ochola Ogaye Mak'Anyengo, Member of Parliament, Assistant Cabinet Minister
 John Mwirichia
 Tom Mboya, Cabinet Minister, assassinated 1969
 Kenneth Matiba
 Musalia Mudavadi, Vice President 4 November 2002 – 30 December 2002
 Joseph Murumbi, Vice President 1965–1967
 Simeon Nyachae
Daisy Nyongesa (born 1989), senator
 Charity Ngilu, first female to run for presidency
 Raila Odinga, former Cabinet Minister, Member of Parliament. Son of Oginga Odinga and former Prime Minister
 Esther Passaris
 Quincy Timberlake, President, Platinum Centraliser and Unionist Party of Kenya
 Appolo Ohanga
 James Orengo
 Robert Ouko, Cabinet Minister, assassinated 1990
 Pio Gama Pinto, assassinated 1965
 Charles Rubia
 George Saitoti, Vice President May 1989 – Dec 1997, April 1999 – 30 August 2002
 Makhan Singh, freedom fighter
 Fitz R S de Souza, Member of Parliament and Deputy Speaker 1963–1970
 Kalonzo Musyoka, Vice President Jan 2008 – March 2013
 William Ruto, Deputy Vice-President April 2013–present
 Martha Karua
 John Michuki
 Njenga Karume
 Jeremiah Nyagah, long-serving cabinet minister and member of Parliament
 Mutahi Kagwe, former Member of Parliament, former Senator and former Cabinet Secretary.
 Harry Thuku
 Koigi Wa Wamwere
 Martin Nyaga Wambora, first Governor of Embu, former chairman of Kenya Airports Authority, successful Runyenjes MP and noted former Kenyan trade secretary
 Samuel Kivuitu, Electoral Commissioner of Kenya (2013)
Prof. Crispus Makau Kiamba, Permanent Secretary in the Ministry of Higher Education, Science and Technology, Government of Kenya from 2008 to 2013.

Activists
Auma Obama
Boniface Mwangi
Esau Khamati Oriedo
Samwel Mohochi, human rights lawyer
Ciiru Waithaka CEO of Funkidz
Eric Njuguna, Climate Activist

Notable civil servants
 Barack Obama Sr.
 Edward H Ntalami
 Stanley Kamang Nganga
 Chris Kirubi
Margaret Nyakang'o
 Muthui Kariuki

Academics, scientists and medical professionals 
Ali Mazrui
Amina Abubakar
Bethwell Allan Ogot
Borna Nyaoke-Anoke
Calestous Juma
Charity Wayua
Davy Kiprotich Koech
Dorothy Wanja Nyingi
Elizabeth Gitau
Esther Ngumbi
Evelyn Gitau
Fardosa Ahmed
Gladys Ngetich
Hope Mwanake
Jemimah Kariuki, doctor
Juliet Obanda Makanga
Leah Marangu
Louise Leakey
Maina wa Kinyatti
Margaret Ogola
Mary Abukutsa-Onyango
Miriam Were
Moses Rugut
Ngũgĩ wa Thiong'o
Ng'endo Mwangi
Paula Kahumbu
Peter Amollo Odhiambo
Reuben Olembo
Richard Leakey
Stellah Wairimu Bosire-Otieno
Steven Runo
Teresia Mbaika Malokwe
Thomas R. Odhiambo
Washington Yotto Ochieng
Winnie Apiyo
Bildad Bosire

Religious leaders
 Cardinal John Njue
 Cardinal Maurice Michael Otunga
 Archbishop John Njenga
Judy Mbugua (born 1947), chair of the Pan African Christian Women Alliance

Business people and entrepreneurs
Benson Wairegi
Chris Kirubi
Dominic Kiarie
Eric Kinoti
Esther Muchemi
Isis Nyong'o
James Mwangi
James Mworia
Jamila Abbas
Mubarak Muyika
Muhoho Kenyatta
Peter Ndegwa
Pradeep Paunrana
Rosemary Odinga
Samuel Kamau Macharia
Sauda Rajab
Susan Oguya
Trushar Khetia
Wilfred Musau

Sports persons
Elisha Barno, distance runner
Matthew Birir
Amos Biwott
Mike Boit
Richard Chelimo
Lonah Chemtai, Kenyan-Israeli Olympic marathon runner
Joyce Chepchumba
Jason Dunford
Paul Ereng
Chris Froome
John Rugoiyo Gichuki
Mbarak Hussein, born in Kenya, now a U.S. citizen, long-distance runner, 
Ben Jipcho
Julius Kariuki
Kipchoge Keino
Ezekiel Kemboi
Joseph Keter
Eliud Kipchoge, marathon world record holder
Wilson Kipketer, born and raised in Kenya, now a citizen of Denmark
Wilson Boit Kipketer
Moses Kiptanui
Sally Kipyego, All American runner for Texas Tech University
Ismael Kirui
Samson Kitur
Daniel Komen
Julius Korir
Paul Korir
Reuben Kosgei
Bernard Lagat
Tegla Loroupe
Edith Masai
Shekhar Mehta
Catherine Ndereba (born 1972), marathon runner
Noah Ngeny
John Ngugi
Margaret Okayo (born 1976), marathon runner
Dennis Oliech, soccer player now based in France
Yobes Ondieki
Dominic Ondoro, distance runner
Henry Rono
Peter Rono
David Rudisha
Moses Tanui
William Tanui
Naftali Temu
Paul Tergat
Steve Tikolo, widely regarded in cricket as the best batsman outside of the test playing nations
Robert Wangila
McDonald Mariga, soccer player now based in Italy, plays for Serie A club Internazionale
Victor Wanyama, soccer player now based in England, plays for Southampton and captains the Kenya national team
Biko Adema, national rugby team player

Environmentalists and conservationists
Elizabeth Wathuti
George Adamson
Helen Gichohi
Ikal Angelei
Joy Adamson
Daphne Sheldrick
Phyllis Omido
Saba Douglas-Hamilton
Wangari Maathai
Wanjira Mathai

Musicians
Timothy "Ennovator" Rimbui
Akothee
Juacali
Jimw@t
Otile Brown
Sauti Sol
Elani
Henrie Mutuku
Naiboi
Sanaipei Tande
Size 8
Gloria Muliro
Mbuvi
Nameless
PinkPantheress
Wakadinali

Writers and playwrights
Asenath Bole Odaga
Binyavanga Wainaina
Chacha Nyaigotti-Chacha
Charity Waciuma
Charles Mangua
Clifton Gachagua
Grace Ogot
Hazel de Silva Mugot
Iman Verjee
Khadambi Asalache
Kinyanjui Kombani
Koigi wa Wamwere
Kuki Gallmann
Makena Onjerika
Margaret Ogola
Marjorie Oludhe Macgoye
Meja Mwangi
Micere Githae Mugo
Moraa Gitaa
Mũkoma wa Ngũgĩ
Mwangi Ruheni
Nanjala Nyabola,
Ngugi wa Mirii
Ngugi Wa Thiong'o
Rocha Chimera
Shailja Patel
Tony Mochama
Wangui wa Goro
Yvonne Adhiambo Owuor

Journalists, bloggers and media personalities
Catherine Kasavuli
Cyprian Nyakundi
Farida Karoney
Hilary Ng'weno
Janet Mbugua
Jeff Koinange
Julie Gichuru
Kui Kinyanjui
Linus Kaikai
Mwenda Njoka
Ory Okolloh
Pamella Makotsi-Sittani
Patrick Gathara
Priya Ramrakha
Robert Alai
Xtian Dela
Zain Verjee

Actors and actresses
Avril (singer)
Charles Gitonga Maina
Christopher Okinda
Eddy Kimani
Edi Gathegi
Edwin Mahinda
John Sibi-Okumu
Joseph Olita
Kiran Shah
Lupita Nyong'o
Maqbul Mohammed
Nana Gichuru
Nini Wacera
Oliver Litondo
Patricia Kihoro
Jackie Nyaminde
Paul Onsongo
Raymond Ofula
Sarah Hassan
Sidede Onyulo
Deep Roy
Sal Hants

References

See also
 List of Kenyan artists
 List of writers from Kenya